Anagyrinus atavus is an extinct species of fossil beetle in the family Gyrinidae, the only species in the genus Anagyrinus. It is known from the Hettangian aged Insektenmergel Formation of Switzerland

References

Gyrinidae
Fossil taxa described in 1865